Hopea brachyptera is a species of plant in the family Dipterocarpaceae. It is endemic to the Philippines.

References

brachyptera
Endemic flora of the Philippines
Trees of the Philippines
Critically endangered flora of Asia
Taxonomy articles created by Polbot